Leibowitz is a Jewish surname. Notable people with the surname include:

 Barry Leibowitz (born 1945), American-Israeli basketball player 
 Henoch Leibowitz (c.1918–2008), head of the Rabbinical Seminary of America
 Jacob Leibowitz or Jakub Lejbowicz, possible birth name of Jacob Frank (1726–1791), leader of a Jewish messianic movement
 Jon Leibowitz (born 1958), former United States Federal Trade Commission chairman
 Jon Stewart (born Jonathan Stuart Leibowitz in 1962), American political satirist, formerly of The Daily Show
 Martin L. Leibowitz, financial researcher and business leader
 Nechama Leibowitz (1905–1997), sometimes Nehama Leibowitz, Israeli Bible scholar
 René Leibowitz (1913–1972), a French composer of Polish-Latvian origin
 Ronnie Leibowitz (born 1953), Israeli bank robber, also known as "Ofnobank"
 Samuel Leibowitz (1893–1978), New York trial lawyer
 Yeshayahu Leibowitz (1903–1994), Israeli thinker and scientist

Fictional characters
 Isaac Edward Leibowitz, a fictional character in the novel A Canticle for Leibowitz

See also
 Labovich
 Lebovits
 Lebovitz
 Lebowitz
 Leibovich
 Leibovitch
 Leibovitz
 Lejbowicz
 Liebowitz

Jewish surnames